Vinay Kumar Tripathi is an Indian officer and locomotive engineer who is serving as Chairperson of the Railway Board and served as General Manager of North Eastern Railway zone.

References 

Chairpersons of the Railway Board
Year of birth missing (living people)
Living people